is a female Japanese illustrator and manga artist. She publishes dōjinshi with the circle . She is also involved in the artwork of adult games.

Works

Manga
  (2002, Kadokawa Shoten), Illustrator
 (2003, Kadokawa Shoten)
 (2006, Kadokawa Shoten)
 Sola (2006, ASCII Media Works), Illustrator; English translation: Sola (2008, Broccoli Books)
  (2007, Hōbunsha); English translation: Welcome to Wakaba-Soh (2009, Yen Press)
  (2007, Akita Shoten), Illustrator
  (2008, ASCII Media Works), Illustrator
  (2010, Kadokawa Shoten), Illustrator of the manga
  (2012, Kadokawa Shoten)

Game
Mitama no yuki (with LiFox)

References

External links
Chako Abeno at LiFox (Japanese)

 
Living people
Year of birth missing (living people)
Japanese female comics artists
Japanese illustrators
Japanese women illustrators
Manga artists